Igors Kazakevičs (born 17 April 1980 in Vietalva, Madona) is a Latvian race walker.

Achievements

References

External links
 
 

1980 births
Living people
Latvian male racewalkers
Athletes (track and field) at the 2008 Summer Olympics
Athletes (track and field) at the 2012 Summer Olympics
Olympic athletes of Latvia